Rostushche is a rural settlement (a selyshche) in the Zaporizhzhia Raion (district) of Zaporizhzhia Oblast in southern Ukraine. Its population was 139 in the 2001 Ukrainian Census. Administratively, it belongs to the Stepne Rural Council, a local government area.

References

Zaporizhzhia Raion
Rural settlements in Zaporizhzhia Oblast
Populated places established in 1946
Populated places established in the Ukrainian Soviet Socialist Republic